Modern Theaters Ltd was an Indian film studio in Salem, Tamil Nadu started by T. R. Sundaram Mudaliar in 1935. The studio produced over more than 150 films until 1982 in Tamil, Telugu, Kannada, Malayalam, Hindi, Sinhalese and even English of which Tamil were the majority.

History

In the early 1930s, T. R. Sundaram entered the world of Tamil cinema as a partner of a Salem-based film company, Angel Films. He was involved in productions such as Draupadi Vastrapaharanam (1934), Dhruva (1935) and Nalla Thangal (1935). Then he decided to start his own company, Modern Theatres Limited. He realized that to make film making a business, it had to be organized and managed like a business enterprise. He also planned a schedule of producing films on a tight budget (two or three a year), so that the market and consumers were regularly and continually supplied with his products.

The maiden production of Modern Theatres, directed by Sundaram, was Sathi Ahalya, a mythological plot was released in 1937. The following year he produced the first Malayalam talkie Balan. Sundaram promoted Modern Theatres as a joint stock company and built a studio on a vast stretch of land on the outskirts of Salem town. The hundred odd films that came from his studio covered a wide spectrum of themes — mythology, comedy and original screenplays to adaptation of classic works of literature and murder mysteries. It is, however, the James Bond style of films starring Jaishankar that are almost synonymous with the banner. 

Following the Hollywood studio system, TRS had on his rolls writers, technicians, actors and so on. He paid generously and promptly, a rarity in the film circle.

Notable contributions
 First time in the world, T. R. Sundaram, the Salem-based Indian movie mogul. It was he who introduced the novel idea of seeking public opinion on the choice of the female and male leads. He advertised in the press, asking moviegoers to suggest the names of artists for the lead roles, and the almost unanimous choice was the 'Dream Girl of Tamil Cinema' Rajakumari as Manonmani and the multi-talented star Chinnappa as the prince-hero. It is perhaps the only incident of its kind in the history of world cinema and certainly in Indian cinema read this article in The Hindu newspaper.  
 Produced the first Malayalam talkie Balan in 1938  
 First Double role in Tamil Films introduced in Uthama Puthiran starring P. U. Chinnappa in the year 1940.
 The first most expensive film to be produced was Manonmani in 1942, starring P. U. Chinnappa and T. R. Rajakumari.
 First Tamil Color film (Geva Color) was Alibabavum Narpadhu Thirudargalum-1956 
 First Malayalam Talkie film called Balan directed by Notani was produced in 1938
 First Malayalam Color film was Kandam Becha Kottu in 1961
 First English film in Tamil Nadu: Modern Theatres teamed up with an American Film company to produce the first English movie in 1952- The Jungle
 First film in which Manorama starred as a heroine is Konjum Kumari in 1963. This is the 97th film for T. R. Sundaram
 First film to have 3 separate stories within a movie was Sow Sow. The 3 stories are Kaligala Mainar, School Drama and Soorapuli.
 When Zoom lens was not invented such an effect was pioneered in Ponmudi (1950 film) for which the French Government awarded the cameraman.
 Has a unique record of having five former Chief Ministers of India in its payroll.
 Frequently used foreigners like Ellis R. Dungan, Mani Lal Tandon, Bomman D. Irani to bring up the quality factor of his films.

Present status
The landmark, situated on nine acres on Yercaud road here, has been handed over to a private construction firm for promoting flats and houses. The promoters, respecting its glorious past, have decided to dismantle the exquisitely designed stone arch carrying the legendary name of `Modern Theatres Limited' and erect it a few metres away with a new name, `Sundar Garden' as per `vasthu sasthra'. Other worn-out buildings, including studio houses and sheds, that figured in many movies are also being brought down. The arch is the only remaining of the glorious past.

T.R. Sundaram's grandson Suman Sundaram who is settled in Australia is currently looking to enter into the film making and follow his grandfather's route in making successful new technology advancement in the Tamil film industry.

Gallery

See also
 List of Modern Theaters Ltd films

References

External links 
 

Indian film studios
Film distributors of India
Film production companies of Tamil Nadu
Entertainment companies established in 1935
1935 establishments in India
Salem, Tamil Nadu